Taumacera is a genus of leaf beetles in the subfamily Galerucinae. It contains about 70 species distributed in the Oriental realm. About 20 African species are also classified in Taumacera, but they may actually belong in a different genus.

Species
Species included in the genus (not including those from Africa), as of 2019:

 Taumacera antennata species-group:
 Taumacera antennata (Mohamedsaid, 1997)
 Taumacera musaamani (Mohamedsaid, 2010)
 Taumacera cervicornis species-group:
 Taumacera cervicornis (Baly, 1861)
 Taumacera lewisi (Jacoby, 1887)
 Taumacera mirabilis (Jacoby, 1887)
 Taumacera unicolor (Jacoby, 1887)
 Taumacera deusta species-group:
 Taumacera centromaculata Medvedev, 2008
 Taumacera constricta Mohamedsaid, 2002
 Taumacera costatipennis (Jacoby, 1896)
 Taumacera dekatevi Reid, 2001
 Taumacera deusta Thunberg, 1814
 Taumacera duri Mohamedsaid, 2001
 Taumacera evi Reid, 1999
 Taumacera fulvicollis (Jacoby, 1881)
 Taumacera fulvovirens (Laboissière, 1929)
 Taumacera khalednordini Mohamedsaid, 2010
 Taumacera laevipennis (Jacoby, 1886)
 Taumacera maculata (Baly, 1886)
 Taumacera midtibialis Mohamedsaid, 1998
 Taumacera mohamedsaidi Reid, 1999
 Taumacera seminigra Reid, 1999
 Taumacera subapicalis Mohamedsaid, 1993
 Taumacera sucki (Weise, 1922)
 Taumacera tibialis Mohamedsaid, 1994
 Taumacera uniformis (Jacoby, 1891)
 Taumacera warisan Mohamedsaid, 1998
 Taumacera insignis species-group:
 Taumacera insignis (Baly, 1864)
 Taumacera yamamotoi (Mohamedsaid, 1998)
 Taumacera nasuta species-group:
 Taumacera clypeata (Baly, 1888)
 Taumacera facialis (Baly, 1886)
 Taumacera frontalis Mohamedsaid, 2001
 Taumacera fulva (Kimoto, 1989)
 Taumacera indicola Bezděk, 2019
 Taumacera kimotoi Bezděk, 2019
 Taumacera martensi (Medvedev, 1990)
 Taumacera medvedevi Bezděk, 2019
 Taumacera nasuta (Baly, 1879)
 Taumacera paradoxa (Laboissière, 1936)
 Taumacera samoderzhenkovi (Medvedev, 1992)
 Taumacera nigricornis species-group:
 Taumacera nigricornis (Baly, 1864)
 Taumacera rufomarginata (Jacoby, 1895)
 Taumacera ventralis (Baly, 1864)
 Taumacera viridis species-group:
 Taumacera aureipennis (Laboissière, 1933)
 Taumacera bella (Weise, 1922)
 Taumacera indica (Jacoby, 1889)
 Taumacera insularis (Gressitt & Kimoto, 1965)
 Taumacera magenta (Gressitt & Kimoto, 1965)
 Taumacera occipitalis (Laboissière, 1933)
 Taumacera sumatrensis (Jacoby, 1884)
 Taumacera variceps (Laboissière, 1933)
 Taumacera viridis (Hope, 1831)
 Unassigned species:
 Taumacera antennalis Medvedev & Romantsov, 2013
 Taumacera apicalis (Baly 1864)
 Taumacera bifasciata (Jacoby, 1899)
 Taumacera coxalis (Jacoby, 1899)
 Taumacera indochinensis (Medvedev, 2004)
 Taumacera jacobyi (Weise, 1922)
 Taumacera javanensis (Jacoby, 1895)
 Taumacera kinabaluensis (Mohamedsaid, 1995)
 Taumacera monstrosa (Jacoby, 1899)
 Taumacera multicostata (Jacoby, 1896)
 Taumacera nagaii (Mohamedsaid, 1998)
 Taumacera nigripennis (Jacoby, 1884)
 Taumacera philippina (Weise, 1913)
 Taumacera rubida (Allard, 1889)
 Taumacera smaragdina (Duvivier, 1884)
 Taumacera submetallica (Jacoby, 1896)
 Taumacera sumatrana (Jacoby, 1899)
 Taumacera suturalis (Duvivier, 1885)
 Taumacera variabilis (Jacoby, 1891)

References

Galerucinae
Chrysomelidae genera
Taxa named by Carl Peter Thunberg
Beetles of Asia